The 1925–26 City Cup was the twenty-eighth edition of the City Cup, a cup competition in Northern Irish football.

The tournament was won by Belfast Celtic for the 3rd time.

Group standings

References

1925–26 in Northern Ireland association football